The Petit Le Mans powered by Mazda was the 2016 edition of the Petit Le Mans automotive endurance race, held on October 1, 2016, at the Road Atlanta circuit in Braselton, Georgia, United States. It was the 12th and final race of the 2016 WeatherTech SportsCar Championship, and the third Petit Le Mans run since the formation of the WeatherTech SportsCar Championship in 2014.

Qualifying
Provisional pole positions in each class are denoted in bold. All Prototype and Prototype Challenge cars were grouped together on the starting grid, regardless of qualifying position.

Results
Class winners are denoted in bold and with

References

External links
 Race Results

Petit Le Mans
Petit Le Mans
Petit Le Mans
Petit Le Mans